Philenora aroa is a moth in the subfamily Arctiinae. It was described by George Thomas Bethune-Baker in 1904. It is found in New Guinea.

The wingspan is 22–24 mm. The forewings are greyish white, with a dark grey antemedial line and a small dark spot at the end of the cell, followed by an irregular dark postmedial line, with a dark grey suffusion in front of the apex. The hindwings are uniform greyish white, with a dark termen.

References

Natural History Museum Lepidoptera generic names catalog

Moths described in 1904
Lithosiini